The spectacled bristle tyrant (Pogonotriccus orbitalis) is a species of passerine bird in the family Tyrannidae. This species is sometimes placed in the genus Phylloscartes.

It is found in Bolivia, Colombia, Ecuador, and Peru.  Its natural habitats are subtropical or tropical moist lowland forests and subtropical or tropical moist montane forests.

References

spectacled bristle tyrant
Birds of the Yungas
spectacled bristle tyrant
Taxonomy articles created by Polbot